Richard J. Norman, BA (Cantab), PhD (London), is a British academic, philosopher and humanist.  He is currently Emeritus Professor of Moral Philosophy at the University of Kent, and a patron of Humanists UK.

Life
Norman formerly taught philosophy at the University of Kent, where his areas of interest were mainly moral and political philosophy, including both theoretical and practical ethics.

Works
His published works include:

 The Moral Philosophers (1983)
 Free and Equal (1987)
 Ethics, Killing and War (1995)
 On Humanism (2004, 2012)
 Religion and Atheism (2017, Editor)

References

External links
 Beyond belief: article by Richard Norman in the New Humanist, November 2009
  Can There be a Just War?: article first published in Think magazine

Living people
British humanists
20th-century British philosophers
21st-century British philosophers
Year of birth missing (living people)